In Norse mythology, Egil is the name of a farmer in the poem Hymiskvida who looked after Thor's goats while the god was visiting the giant Hymir. Egil is possibly the father of Thor's servants Þjálfi and Röskva due to certain similarities found in Snorri's Gylfaginning. In both poems the gods embark on a journey to visit giants, on the way they stop at the home of a farmer or peasant, and at one point one of Thor's goats becomes lame. Hymiskvida states that Loki was the cause of the laming, but Egil was held responsible since in the next stanza his two children (who are not named) are taken by Thor into his service just before the end of the poem.

Characters in Norse mythology
Thor
Fictional farmers